Santa Clarita (Spanish for "Little St. Clare") is a city in northwestern Los Angeles County in the U.S. state of California. With a 2020 census population of 228,673, it is the third-largest city by population in Los Angeles County, the 17th-largest in California, and the 99th-largest city in the United States. It is a classic example of a U.S. edge city, satellite city, or boomburb.

Human settlement of the Santa Clarita Valley dates back to the arrival of the Chumash people, who were displaced by the Tataviam circa 450 AD. After Spanish colonists arrived in Alta California, the Rancho San Francisco was established, covering much of the Santa Clarita Valley. Henry Mayo Newhall purchased the Rancho San Francisco in 1875 and established the towns of Saugus and Newhall. The Newhall Land and Farming Company played a major role in the city's development. In December 1987, the city of Santa Clarita was incorporated, encompassing the communities of Canyon Country, Newhall, Saugus, and Valencia. The four communities retain separate identities, and residents commonly refer to one of them when asked where they are from. Santa Clarita is bounded on the west by the Golden State Freeway (I-5). The Antelope Valley Freeway (CA-14) runs northeast–southwest forming part of the city's irregular east boundary. The two freeways meet at Newhall Pass, near the city's southernmost point.

Santa Clarita is home to three institutions of higher education: California Institute of the Arts, an internationally renowned art university; The Master's University, a Christian liberal arts university; and College of the Canyons, a community college. Companies headquartered in or near the city include Princess Cruises, Sunkist, Remo, and the Newhall Land and Farming Company. The unincorporated communities of Castaic and Stevenson Ranch, located to the north and west of the Santa Clarita city limits, respectively, are closely associated with the city. Six Flags Magic Mountain, though commonly thought to be in the Valencia part of Santa Clarita, is also west of Interstate 5 and outside of the Santa Clarita city limits.

Name
The Santa Clara River was named by Spanish explorers for Saint Clare of Assisi. The valley and the settlement later became known as "little Santa Clara" ("Santa Clarita" in the Spanish diminutive) to distinguish it from the Northern Californian city of Santa Clara and its accompanying Mission Santa Clara. The Santa Clarita Valley similarly differentiates itself from the Santa Clara Valley in Northern California. The region was not widely referred to as Santa Clarita until the 1950s; before this, it was unofficially referred to as the "Newhall–Saugus area" and the "Bonelli tract," after a family which owned land in the valley.

History

Pre-Columbian and Spanish colonial eras
The Santa Clarita Valley has been settled for millennia before European arrival. The oldest archaeological site in the area dates back to roughly 3000 BC. About AD 450, the Tataviam arrived, displacing the Chumash people who previously inhabited the area. The Tataviam lived in approximately 20 villages in the valley and surrounding areas including Piru, Agua Dulce, Elizabeth Lake, and Tochonanga.

In the 18th century, Spanish colonists arrived in southern California including Santa Clarita, founding mission settlements. In 1822, Alta California, which included most of the present-day southwestern United States including all of California, became a territory of the newly independent country of Mexico.

The  Rancho San Francisco land grant was issued by Juan Bautista Alvarado, governor of Alta California, to Mexican army officer Antonio del Valle. It was an agricultural area serving the nearby Mission San Fernando.

1822–1899: Gold discovery, Mentryville, and Henry Mayo Newhall
In 1842, Francisco Lopez discovered gold in Placerita Canyon—the first documented discovery of gold in California. The discovery is commemorated in an 1842 mining claim issued by Governor Alvarado. The Oak of the Golden Dream, which marks the site of the discovery, remains an attraction for tourists. Several places throughout Santa Clarita carry the "Golden Oak" name, including Golden Oak Road in Saugus; Golden Oak Lane, Golden Oak Ranch, and Golden Oak Adult School in Newhall; and Golden Oak Community School in Canyon Country.

The United States acquired California in 1848, after winning the Mexican–American War. The community of Newhall is named after Henry Newhall, an American businessman who made his fortune during the California Gold Rush. He founded the H.M. Newhall & Company, a successful auction house in San Francisco. Newhall had also invested in rail companies that would connect San Francisco to other cities and became president of the San Francisco and San Jose Railroad. In 1870, he and his partners sold the company to Southern Pacific Railroad, and he served on Southern Pacific's board of directors.

From 1858 to 1861, the Santa Clarita Valley was used as a transportation corridor for the Butterfield Overland Mail stagecoach service as part of its first division, stretching from San Francisco to Los Angeles. Two Butterfield Overland Mail stations were located in the area: Lyons Station in Newhall, and King's Station in San Francisquito Canyon. Beale's Cut was constructed in 1859 through what is now known as the Newhall Pass.

After railroads, Newhall turned to real estate and ranching. The most significant portion was the Rancho San Francisco, which he purchased for $2/acre. It became known as Newhall Ranch after Newhall's death. Within this territory, Newhall granted a right-of-way to Southern Pacific through what is now Newhall Pass. He also sold the railroad part of the land, upon which the company built the town of Newhall, founded just north of the present-day intersection of Magic Mountain Parkway and Railroad Avenue. He moved the town south in 1879, and the original townsite was named Saugus, after Henry Newhall's hometown of Saugus, Massachusetts.

After his death, Newhall's heirs incorporated the Newhall Land and Farming Company in 1883. Since its founding, it has overseen the development of the communities that comprise present-day Santa Clarita, including the master-planned community of Valencia (in which it is headquartered), Canyon Country, Newhall, and Saugus. The company also manages farm land elsewhere in the state.

On September 5, 1876, Charles Crocker, president of the Southern Pacific Company, hammered a ceremonial spike into a railroad tie at Lang Southern Pacific Station in what is now far eastern Canyon Country, marking the completion of the San Joaquin Valley line of the Southern Pacific Railroad, connecting Los Angeles to San Francisco and the rest of the nation for the first time.

In the 1850s and 1860s, businessmen and political leaders such as Andrés Pico, Sanford Lyon, Henry Clay Wiley, Darius Towsley, and Christopher Leaming came to the Santa Clarita Valley for its oil reserves. On September 26, 1876, the town of Mentryville was founded by French immigrant Charles Alexander Mentry near present-day Stevenson Ranch. Mentryville's Pico Number 4 oil well was the first commercially successful oil well in the western United States. Oil from Mentryville was refined at Pioneer Oil Refinery in Newhall, the first viable oil refinery in the state. (Pioneer Oil Refinery is currently the only site on the National Register of Historic Places within the city limits of Santa Clarita.) By the early 1900s, most of Pico Canyon's richest oil reserves had been depleted, although Pico Number 4 continued to operate until 1990. Many of the aforementioned oil pioneers have lent their names to streets in the valley, such as Pico Canyon Road, Lyons Avenue, Wiley Canyon Road, and Towsley Canyon Road. Drilling continues to occur in Santa Clarita at the Honor Rancho Oil Field and in the area between Placerita Canyon Road and Golden Valley High School.

The Saugus Cafe was established in 1886 near the present-day intersection of Railroad Avenue and Magic Mountain Parkway. It is the oldest continuously operating restaurant in Los Angeles County.

1900–1987
Los Angeles studios began filming in Santa Clarita shortly after the turn of the 20th century. Actors in these early films included William S. Hart, Tom Mix, Harry Carey, and a young John Wayne. Many movie ranches (see section below) were developed in the Santa Clarita Valley. Hart and Carey made their homes in the valley; today both their former estates are operated as county parks.

One major contributor to the valley's early development was the Whittaker-Bermite Corporation. From 1934 to 1987, the corporation manufactured, stored, and tested explosives, including bombs and bottle rockets, on a 996-acre site south of Soledad Canyon Road, east of Railroad Avenue, northeast of the Circle J Ranch community, southwest of Centre Pointe Parkway, and west of Golden Valley Road. The first housing tract in the area consisted of company homes along Walnut Street in Newhall. In modern times, the California Department of Toxic Substances Control has made efforts to clean the area of perchlorate and other toxic chemicals left behind by decades of munitions testing. Today, the area persists as a gap in the urban development of Santa Clarita.

The Santa Clarita Valley was the scene of the second deadliest disaster in California's history, known as the "worst civil engineering failure of the 20th century." Shortly before midnight on March 12, 1928, the St. Francis Dam collapsed. By the time the floodwaters reached the Pacific Ocean near Ventura five hours later, 411 people had died. Some buildings in Newhall became makeshift morgues. After the disaster, engineer William Mulholland resigned from his position as superintendent of the Los Angeles Bureau of Water Works and Supply (now the Department of Water and Power).

On December 27, 1936, United Airlines Trip 34 crashed into a hilltop in Rice Canyon which is near Newhall, killing all twelve people on board.

In 1945, the Santa Clarita Union High School District was created. The following year it was renamed William S. Hart Union High School District after William S. Hart. The district's first high school was William S. Hart High School in Newhall.

The first official use of the name "Santa Clarita" in a housing development appeared in the Rancho Santa Clarita housing tract in Saugus, built in 1947.

Fowler sought to reactivate the KKK in California, where it was banned by law since 1946. Estimates of the rally's size range from 30 to 100 people, far fewer than the 5,000 to 10,000 Fowler expected. The rally took place on United States Forest Service property and included a fake cross burning. Just one person was arrested at the rally — for assaulting a police officer he mistook for a Klansman.

On April 5, 1970, four CHP officers were shot dead by two heavily armed career criminals at a Standard Gas Station in present-day Valencia. The shootout was the deadliest attack on law enforcement in California history. As Valencia had barely been developed, it came to be known as the Newhall incident. One of the perpetrators was sentenced to life in prison; the other committed suicide. In the aftermath of the incident, policing was transformed nationwide—police training and weaponry were improved and bullet proof vests became widespread.

In the early morning of July 23, 1982, a helicopter crash occurred at the Indian Dunes amusement park in Valencia during the making of Twilight Zone: The Movie, killing three people.

1987–present: City of Santa Clarita

After multiple failed attempts to form a city and at least two failed attempts to form a separate county, residents of the Santa Clarita Valley finally incorporated the City of Santa Clarita on December 15, 1987. The proposal passed by a margin of two to one in that year's general election. Other proposed names for the city were "City of the Canyons" and "La Mancha" ("blemish" in Spanish); "Santa Clarita" narrowly defeated "City of the Canyons." The city's first mayor was future Congressman Buck McKeon.

In 1990, the federal government awarded Cemex a contract to mine millions of tons of sand and gravel in Soledad Canyon, just east of the city. The proposed mine caused controversy due to its potential for air pollution, traffic congestion, and environmental damage to the Angeles National Forest and Santa Clara River. The city of Santa Clarita fought for decades to prevent mining in the canyon. In 2019, the Interior Board of Land Appeals (part of the United States Department of the Interior) upheld a 2015 decision by the Bureau of Land Management, permanently preventing Cemex from mining in Soledad Canyon. Cemex had never mined any sand or gravel in the canyon.

Santa Clarita was devastated by the 1994 Northridge earthquake. The Newhall Pass interchange of I-5 and CA-14 collapsed, and Sierra Highway became the only route in and out of the valley; Sierra Highway was soon closed as well. Several surface streets throughout the city were closed due to structural damage. The Four Corners oil spill led to contamination of the Santa Clara River. Electricity was temporarily shut off for the entire valley, and schools were closed. Shelters opened in Newhall, Saugus, and Canyon Country. The National Guard was sent to the area, and City Hall was temporarily relocated. Water distribution points were set up as residents lost access to running water. The city suffered an estimated $76.8 million in damages.

Santa Clarita was ranked in 2006 by Money magazine as 18th of the 100 best places to live in the United States.

On November 14, 2019, a mass shooting occurred at Saugus High School. That morning, Nathaniel Berhow, a 16-year-old junior at the school, used a semi-automatic pistol to shoot five other students, killing two of them, before turning his gun on himself. The shooting lasted 16 seconds. Survivors were reunited with their parents at nearby Central Park, and injured students were sent to Henry Mayo Hospital in Valencia and Providence Holy Cross Medical Center in Mission Hills. The shooter succumbed to his self-inflicted injuries the following day in the hospital. A vigil honoring the victims was held at Central Park the next day.

In the 21st century, the city's developed area has expanded significantly as Lennar, Tri Pointe Homes, and KB Home have constructed housing developments in the area. Recent developments within the city limits include Five Knolls, Aliento, Skyline Ranch, Vista Canyon, West Creek, West Hills, River Village, and Toll Brothers at Plum Canyon; just outside the city, the large FivePoint Valencia subdivision is in construction. Some of these developments, such as River Village, Villa Metro, and Five Knolls, were constructed near the city center, while others were constructed near the city's edges and later annexed into the city.

Geography

Nearly half of the city's land area has been acquired via annexations; the city's area at the time of incorporation was just . The Newhall Pass is located at the southern end of the city, south of Newhall and north of the San Fernando Valley communities of Granada Hills and Sylmar.

Santa Clarita lies within the Santa Clarita Valley, bounded by the San Gabriel Mountains to the east, the Santa Susana Mountains to the south and west, and the Sierra Pelona Mountains to the north, all part of the Transverse Ranges.

The broad Santa Clara River passes through the city from east to west. Though usually dry, the river exhibits significant surface flow during seasonal episodes of heavy rainfall. The river's numerous tributaries incise the hilly terrain of the valley to form steep canyons after which many of the city's major streets are named. The largest of these canyons are Bouquet Canyon, San Francisquito Canyon, Sand Canyon, and Soledad Canyon.

City limits
Currently, the city is bounded by Interstate 5 to the west, extending east to include almost all developed areas of the Santa Clarita Valley east of the freeway. Part of the city's eastern boundary follows California State Route 14, although the city limits extend beyond Route 14 to include the communities of Aliento, Fair Oaks Ranch, Vista Canyon, and Sand Canyon; the Plaza at Golden Valley shopping center; and the Whitney Canyon, Elsmere Canyon, Golden Valley Ranch, Walker Ranch, and East Walker Ranch open spaces. Santa Clarita extends as far east as the eastern end of Shenandoah Lane, east of Shadow Pines Boulevard in Canyon Country. The city limits also include a small exclave west of Interstate 5 in Towsley Canyon Park. The Angeles National Forest forms part of the city's northern and eastern boundaries, although parts of northern Saugus (north of Copper Hill Drive and Haskell Canyon Road) and Canyon Country (south of Placerita and Sand Canyon Roads) extend into the national forest.

Topography
Elevation varies substantially throughout the city. The highest residential areas of Canyon Country, north of Skyline Ranch Road and east of Shadow Pines Boulevard, exceed .

Geology

Santa Clarita is near the San Fernando fault zone and has been affected by the 1971 San Fernando earthquake and 1994 Northridge earthquake (see above), both of which had epicenters in the San Fernando Valley.

Climate
Santa Clarita experiences hot, very dry summers and cool winters with moderate precipitation. Due to its close proximity to the Mojave Desert (High Desert) and Pacific Ocean, and the city's wide range of elevations, varying micro-climates are common. There is a large degree of diurnal temperature variation, especially in the summer. According to the Köppen climate classification, Santa Clarita experiences a hot-summer Mediterranean climate (Csa).

During the summer, hot weather is predominant with occasional high humidity and cumulus buildups over the higher terrain surrounding the valley. Thunderstorms occasionally occur during influxes of monsoonal moisture in the summer as well as during Pacific storms in the winter. The warmest months are July and August, though summer-like temperatures can occur even in May and October. During this time, average high temperatures are in the 90s Fahrenheit (32–38 °C), but can rise to well over  during heat waves. Temperatures have reached  as recently as September 6, 2020. Winters are mild, with temperatures dropping below freezing occasionally on clear winter nights. Rain falls primarily from December through March; snow is rare but can fall in small quantities during the winter; infact, there was some snow in 2023.  Santa Clarita lies within USDA plant hardiness zone 9b, except for a small portion of southern Newhall which is in zone 10a. Santa Clarita's average temperatures are more extreme than in downtown Los Angeles but less extreme than in the Antelope Valley.

Wildfires

Characterized by dry hills covered in brush and chaparral, Santa Clarita is susceptible to wildfires. Although wildfires are most common in summer and fall, they can occur throughout the year during drought conditions, such as in December 2017. Wildfire risk is highest when Santa Ana winds blow through the area from the Mojave Desert.

Notable wildfires in the Santa Clarita Valley include the Rye Fire, Buckweed Fire, Sand Fire, and Tick Fire.

Ecology

Santa Clarita is located along the boundary between the WWF-designated California coastal sage and chaparral ecoregion to the southwest, and California montane chaparral and woodlands ecoregion to the northeast.

Cityscape

Although generally considered a large suburb of Greater Los Angeles, the city of Santa Clarita consists of four distinct communities: Canyon Country, Newhall, Saugus, and Valencia. Each community is characterized by a mixture of single-family homes, townhomes, apartment buildings, condominiums, and commercial and industrial areas. Valencia, a master-planned community, contains the city's largest shopping center (Westfield Valencia Town Center) and most of the city's corporate headquarters, government buildings, hotels, and tallest buildings. The neighborhoods in Canyon Country and Saugus are characterized by a wide age range, from older developments dating from the 1960s or earlier to new developments built in the 21st century. Newhall, the oldest area of the city, has also experienced new commercial and industrial development. Throughout the city, single-family suburban tract housing predominates, with apartment and condominium complexes along major thoroughfares. Many communities in Santa Clarita, especially in newer areas, have homeowner associations, and some are gated. Placerita Canyon and Sand Canyon are equestrian communities with large custom ranch homes.

Communities just outside the city limits include Agua Dulce, Castaic, Stevenson Ranch, unincorporated Valencia, and Val Verde. All residents of the Santa Clarita Valley, both inside and outside the city, may use either their neighborhood or "Santa Clarita" for their mailing addresses.

The neighborhoods of Santa Clarita are vaguely defined, and in some cases, sources conflict on their boundaries. For example, some sources include Arroyo Seco Junior High School in Valencia, while other sources place it in Saugus. The area of Newhall's 91321 ZIP code north of Golden Valley Road is often considered part of Canyon Country.

Demographics

Historically, Santa Clarita's population has been predominantly non-Hispanic White. Starting in the 1960s and continuing into the 1990s, white Americans, primary those from affluent backgrounds, began migrating from Los Angeles to suburban cities such as Santa Clarita, Calabasas, Malibu, Thousand Oaks, and Camarillo. However, from 1980s onward, the city's population has become increasingly diverse. The non-Hispanic White percentage of the population has dropped from 80.6% in 1990 to 44.5% in 2020. The total White population (including those of Hispanic heritage) has proportionately decreased from 97.2% in 1970 to 50.8% in 2020. Nevertheless, non-Hispanic Whites remain the largest ethnic group in the city, and Santa Clarita's non-Hispanic white percentage is higher than the California statewide average of 34.7%, but lower than the national average of 57.8%.

Santa Clarita's population growth rate has historically outpaced county, state, and national averages. In 2019, Santa Clarita was ranked 20th out of 515 U.S. cities in population and economic growth, and was second among California cities. During the 2010 census, Santa Clarita was the fourth-largest city in Los Angeles County, however it has since surpassed Glendale as the county's third-largest city. However, in 2021, the United States Census Bureau estimates showed a 2% decline in the city's population, in line with the rest of Los Angeles County. It is the largest city in Los Angeles County north of the Newhall Pass. The city's median household income of $100,932 is higher than both statewide and national averages. ZIP code 91321 (Newhall) is the only ZIP code in the city with a median household income below the statewide average.

As in most United States cities, different ethnic groups in Santa Clarita are concentrated in different areas. Non-Hispanic whites are present in most areas of the city but are especially dominant in Saugus and Valencia. Canyon Country, Newhall, and Val Verde have large Hispanic populations — some areas around Railroad and Newhall Avenues in Newhall, as well as Jakes Way in Canyon Country, are almost entirely Hispanic. There are significant Asian-American populations in Stevenson Ranch, Valencia, and parts of Saugus and Canyon Country. However, most communities throughout the city are racially mixed. Socioeconomic status also varies throughout the city: the highest median household incomes are found in northern Valencia and Saugus and areas of Canyon Country east of State Route 14, while the lowest median incomes are found near Old Town Newhall and the western and central parts of Canyon Country. As of the 2019-20 school year, the percentage of students at high schools eligible for free or reduced-price lunch ranged from 13% at Valencia High School to 51.2% at Golden Valley High School.

As a part of Los Angeles County, Santa Clarita is located within the Los Angeles-Long Beach-Anaheim, CA metropolitan statistical area and the Los Angeles-Long Beach, CA combined statistical area.

2020
As of the 2020 United States census, Santa Clarita had a population of 228,673. The city's racial makeup was 50.8% white (44.5% non-Hispanic white), 11.7% non-Hispanic Asian American, 4.0% non-Hispanic black or African American, 0.2% non-Hispanic Native American, 0.1% non-Hispanic Pacific Islander, 0.1% non-Hispanics of other races, and 4.5% from two or more races. 34.4% of the population were Hispanic or Latino of any race. Of the city's 78,586 housing units, 1,894 (2.4%) were vacant.

During the five-year period from 2016 to 2020, the median household income in Santa Clarita was $100,932, and the median family income was $113,304. 9.2% of the city's population and 5.9% of the families were below the poverty line. As of January 2023, the median home price in Santa Clarita was $739,374 ($785,796 for single-family homes and $522,662 for condos).

Approximately 129,905 residents (56.8% of the city population) lived north of the Santa Clara River, and 98,768 residents (43.2%) lived south of the river.

2019
The 2019 American Community Survey reported that the city's population was 212,979, and the population of the larger Santa Clarita urban area (including unincorporated Stevenson Ranch, Valencia, and Castaic) was 260,999. The ethnic composition of the city was 72.6% white (47.2% non-Hispanic white), 34.6% Hispanic or Latino (of any race), 10.4% Asian American, 4.9% black or African American, 1.2% Native American, 0.3% Pacific Islander, 8.3% from other races, and 4.0% from two or more races.

20.8% of the city's population was born outside the United States. Among residents 25 years of age and older, 36.9% had a bachelor's degree or higher. 65.3% of the population 5 years and older spoke only English at home, while 23.4% spoke Spanish, 3.4% spoke other Indo-European languages, and 6.1% spoke Asian or Pacific Island languages.

2010
The 2010 United States Census reported that Santa Clarita had a population of 176,320. The racial makeup of Santa Clarita was 125,005 (70.9%) White (56.1% Non-Hispanic White), 5,623 (3.2%) African American, 1,013 (0.6%) Native American, 15,025 (8.5%) Asian (3.4% Filipino, 1.7% Korean, 0.8% Indian, 0.8% Chinese, 0.6% Japanese, 0.3% Vietnamese, 0.9% Other Asian), 272 (0.2%) Pacific Islander, 21,169 (12.0%) from other races, and 8,213 (4.7%) from two or more races. There were 51,941 people of Hispanic or Latino origin, of any race (29.5% of the population).

The census reported that 174,910 people (99.2% of the population) lived in households, 1,281 (0.7%) lived in non-institutionalized group quarters, and 129 (0.1%) were institutionalized.
There were 59,507 households, out of which 24,677 (41.5%) had children under the age of 18 living in them, 34,126 (57.3%) were opposite-sex married couples living together, 6,888 (11.6%) had a female householder with no husband present, 3,322 (5.6%) had a male householder with no wife present. There were 3,134 (5.3%) unmarried opposite-sex partnerships, and 484 (0.8%) same-sex married couples or partnerships. 11,634 households (19.6%) were made up of individuals, and 4,335 (7.3%) had someone living alone who was 65 years of age or older. The average household size was 2.94. There were 44,336 families (74.5% of all households); the average family size was 3.37.

In terms of age, the population included 46,180 people (26.2%) under the age of 18, 17,565 people (10.0%) aged 18 to 24, 47,788 people (27.1%) aged 25 to 44, 47,936 people (27.2%) aged 45 to 64, and 16,851 people (9.6%) who were 65 years of age or older. The median age was 36.2 years. For every 100 females, there were 97.1 males. For every 100 females age 18 and over, there were 94.0 males.

The homeowner vacancy rate was 1.4%; the rental vacancy rate was 6.0%. 124,532 people (70.6% of the population) lived in owner-occupied housing units and 50,378 people (28.6%) lived in rental housing units.

According to the Census Bureau, Santa Clarita had a median household income of $82,607, with 9.5% of the population living below the federal poverty line.

2000
As of the census of 2000, there were 151,088 people, 50,787 households, and 38,242 families residing in the city. The population density was 3,159.1 inhabitants per square mile (1,219.6/km2). The racial makeup of the city was 79.5% White (69.3% Non-Hispanic White), 20.5% Hispanic or Latino of any race, 8.5% from other races, 5.2% Asian, 3.9% from two or more races, 2.1% African American, 0.6% Native American, and 0.1% Pacific Islander.

There were 50,787 households, out of which 44.4% had children under the age of 18 living with them, 61.0% were married couples living together, 9.8% had a female householder with no husband present, and 24.7% were non-families. 18.7% of all households were made up of individuals, and 6.1% had someone living alone who was 65 years of age or older. The average household size was 2.95 and the average family size was 3.38.

In the city, the population was spread out, with 30.3% under the age of 18, 8.1% from 18 to 24, 33.6% from 25 to 44, 20.8% from 45 to 64, and 7.1% who were 65 years of age or older. The median age was 33 years. For every 100 females, there were 98.0 males. For every 100 females age 18 and over, there were 94.4 males.

According to a 2007 estimate, the median income for a household in the city was $79,004, and the median income for a family was $91,450. Males had a median income of $53,769 versus $36,835 for females. The per capita income for the city was $26,841. 6.4% of the population and 4.7% of families were below the poverty line. 6.7% of those under the age of 18 and 5.9% of those 65 and older were living below the poverty line.

Religion

According to bestplaces.net, 53.4% of Santa Clarita's population is religious. Christians comprise 50.5% of the city's population. Of these, 37% are Catholic, 2% are Baptist, 1.8% are Pentecostal, 1.6% are Mormon, 1.2% are Methodist, and 5.2% were other Christians. Among non-Christians, 1.1% of Santa Clarita residents are Jewish, 0.7% are Muslim, are 1.1% follow Eastern religions.

Christianity is the dominant religion in Santa Clarita, and the city has many Christian churches of the Protestant, Catholic, and Mormon denominations — among them are North Oaks Church of Christ, Church of the Canyons, Santa Clarita Baptist Church, The Church of Hope, and Friendly Valley Community Church in Canyon Country; Elevate Church, Village Church, First Presbyterian Church of Newhall, Placerita Bible Church, and Faith Community Church in Newhall; Grace Baptist Church, Saint Kateri Tekakwitha Catholic Church, Bouquet Canyon Church, Calvary Chapel, and Santa Clarita United Methodist Church in Saugus; and Real Life Church, Higher Vision Church, Valencia Hills Community Church, and NorthPark Community Church in Valencia.

Synagogues in Santa Clarita include Chabad of Santa Clarita Valley and Temple Beth Ami in Newhall, and Congregation Beth Shalom in Saugus.

There are three mosques in the city: the Islamic Center of Santa Clarita Valley in north Saugus, Unity Center in Newhall, and Al Umma Center of Santa Clarita in Canyon Country.

Homelessness
In June 2020, the Los Angeles Homeless Services Authority reported 168 homeless people in Santa Clarita, down from 258 in 2019. The Bridge to Home organization provides assistance for homeless people in the valley. Its administrative offices are located on Newhall Avenue in Newhall, and its client housing shelter is on Drayton Street in Saugus. Santa Clarita's percentage of homeless people is low compared to Los Angeles County as a whole.

Government and politics

According to the California Secretary of State, as of February 10, 2019, Santa Clarita has 135,052 registered voters. Of those, 46,096 (34.1%) are registered Democrats, 45,725 (33.9%) are registered Republicans, and 35,764 (26.5%) have declined to state a political party.

In presidential elections, Santa Clarita has historically been a Republican stronghold. However, it has shifted toward the Democratic Party in recent years. Hillary Clinton and Joe Biden won the city in 2016 and 2020, respectively. Santa Clarita remains one of the most conservative cities in Los Angeles County, having voted for Clinton and Biden by much smaller margins than the county and state as a whole, both of which are strongly Democratic.

Local government
The City of Santa Clarita is a general law city and as such is governed by a council–manager form of government. The city council is made up of five council members, elected at-large to four-year terms. Each year the council selects one of its members to serve as mayor, a largely ceremonial position. Mayors are not directly elected. In March 2020, the city council declared its intention to switch to district-based elections, however the transition has been delayed due to the COVID-19 pandemic.

The city hall is located at 23920 Valencia Boulevard, Santa Clarita, CA 91355.

The current elected council

According to the city's Comprehensive Annual Financial Report for fiscal year 2019–20, the city's various funds included $116.3 million in revenues, $112.6 million in expenditures, $1.482 billion in total assets, and $217.2 million in total liabilities.

The structure of the management and coordination of city services

List of mayors
Santa Clarita has had 15 mayors since its incorporation, serving 35 terms.

County, state and federal representation
In the Los Angeles County Board of Supervisors, Santa Clarita is in the 5th district which is represented by Republican Kathryn Barger.

California is represented by US Senators Dianne Feinstein and Alex Padilla, both Democrats.

Education

Elementary schools
Santa Clarita elementary school students (grades TK/K-6) are served by four elementary school districts.
Castaic Union School District: serves Castaic, Val Verde, and a small residential and mostly commercial/industrial portion of northwestern Valencia.
Newhall School District: serves Stevenson Ranch, Newhall, and southern Valencia.
Saugus Union School District: serves Saugus, northern and central Valencia, and western Canyon Country.
Sulphur Springs School District: serves the majority of Canyon Country.
These four school districts include 37 elementary schools and one middle school (Castaic Middle School, administered by Castaic Union School District).

Junior high and high schools
With the exception of Castaic Middle School, all junior high and high schools (grades 7-12) serving Santa Clarita are part of the William S. Hart Union High School District. The district includes seven general-education high schools (Canyon, Castaic, Golden Valley, Hart, Saugus, Valencia, and West Ranch) and six general-education junior high schools (Arroyo Seco, La Mesa, Placerita, Rancho Pico, Rio Norte, and Sierra Vista). All Hart District schools are located within Santa Clarita city limits, except for Castaic High School in unincorporated Castaic, and Rancho Pico Junior High and West Ranch High School in unincorporated Stevenson Ranch; however these schools also serve portions of the city. The seven aforementioned high schools in the Hart District compete in the Foothill League athletic conference. U.S. News & World Report has ranked Hart District high schools in the top 12% in the nation. The district's headquarters are located along Centre Pointe Parkway.

Hart District also includes seven special schools: a middle college high school (Academy of the Canyons), on the College of the Canyons campus; the alternative high schools Bowman and Learning Post, with adjacent campuses along Centre Pointe Parkway; Santa Clarita Valley International Charter School (SCVi) in Castaic; the Opportunities for Learning (OFL) charter school, with campuses in Canyon Country and Valencia; and Golden Oak Adult School.

Private schools
Private schools in Santa Clarita include Santa Clarita Christian School, Trinity Classical Academy, Legacy Christian Academy, La Petite Academy, Our Lady of Perpetual Help School, Guidepost Montessori, and Tutor Time. Guidepost Montessori and Tutor Time have two campuses in the city.

Colleges and universities

The city is home to California Institute of the Arts (CalArts), a private art university. Founded in 1961 by Walt Disney, Roy O. Disney, and Nelbert Chouinard, CalArts was the first college or university created specifically for students of visual and performing arts. It was created by the merger of Chouinard Art Institute and the Los Angeles Conservatory of Music. It relocated to its current Valencia campus in 1971, on McBean Parkway near Interstate 5. CalArts has produced numerous renowned actors and musicians including Brad Bird, Tim Burton, Julia Holter, John Lasseter, Marina Rosenfeld, Andrew Stanton, and Carl Stone among others. CalArts is currently administered by president Ravi Rajan.

The Master's University is a non-denominational, Christian liberal arts university based in the Placerita Canyon neighborhood of Newhall. Founded as Los Angeles Baptist College and Seminary in 1927, it moved to Santa Clarita in 1961 and later adopted the name The Master's College and then The Master's University. The university also operates The Master's Seminary in Sun Valley, Los Angeles. The university is currently led by Interim President Abner Chou, following the resignation of Dr. Sam Horn in February 2021. John F. MacArthur served as president from 1985 to 2019; he currently serves as chancellor.

College of the Canyons (COC) is a public community college with two campuses. The main campus is located in Valencia, at the southwest corner of Rockwell Canyon Road and Valencia Boulevard. The secondary Canyon Country campus is located on Sierra Highway between Skyline Ranch Road and Sand Canyon Road. The two COC campuses comprise the Santa Clarita Community College District of California Community Colleges.

Charter College has a campus at the intersection of Soledad Canyon Road and Hidaway Avenue in Canyon Country.

Parks and recreation

Six Flags Magic Mountain

One of the most well-known attractions in the Santa Clarita Valley is the Six Flags Magic Mountain theme park, located just outside the city limits. Six Flags occupies 262 acres of land on the west side of the valley, in unincorporated Valencia. It opened on May 29, 1971, as a development of the Newhall Land and Farming Company and SeaWorld Inc. It was sold to Six Flags in 1979. Six Flags has 19 roller coasters, the most of any amusement park in the world. The park received an estimated 3.365 million visitors in 2017. It is one of 26 Six Flags properties in North America. The park's property also includes the 25-acre waterpark, Six Flags Hurricane Harbor, which operates from late spring to early fall.

City parks and facilities

Since incorporation, the City of Santa Clarita's leadership has placed a priority on offering recreational facilities and programs. The city operates a park system which includes 35 parks scattered throughout the city. Many of the parks have lighted basketball and tennis courts as well as baseball, softball, and soccer fields. The largest city park in Santa Clarita is Central Park in Saugus, on the south side of Bouquet Canyon Road, which includes four outdoor basketball courts; several baseball, softball, and soccer fields; a community garden; disc golf course; cross country course; and the Central Bark dog park.

The George A. Caravalho Sports Complex, located near the intersection of Golden Valley Road and Centre Pointe Parkway in Canyon Country, includes a gymnasium with two indoor, full-sized basketball courts, four pickleball courts, two volleyball courts, two futsal courts, and four racquetball courts. The Sports Complex includes the City of Santa Clarita Activities Center (a.k.a. The Centre) which contains rooms for banquets and meetings. The Sports Complex also includes the Santa Clarita Aquatic Center, which includes three large swimming pools and several water slides; the Trek Bike Park of Santa Clarita covering 7 acres including BMX and mountain biking trails; the Santa Clarita Skate Park; and the Canine Country dog park. Many of the city's recreational programs are held at the Sports Complex.

Over the past several years, the city has cosponsored a summer concert series in cooperation with various local businesses. These concerts, offering a variety of musicians, are offered free of charge and take place on weekends in Central Park. The concert was canceled in 2020 due to the COVID-19 pandemic. The city offers a wide variety of fee-based and free classes and programs in a variety of locations throughout the year.

The city operates two community centers: the Newhall Community Center, adjacent to the Newhall Metrolink station; and the Canyon Country Community Center (CCCC), at the northeast corner of Sierra Highway and Soledad Canyon Road. The Canyon Country Community Center was located at Sierra Highway and Flying Tiger Drive before its relocation in October 2021.

City-sponsored recreational programs are listed in the quarterly magazine Seasons, which is delivered to all residences within the city limits via mail.

The Santa Clarita Marathon is an annual race through the city's streets and paseos. First run in 1995, it is now considered a qualifying race for the Boston Marathon. Previously held in November, starting in 2022 it was permanently moved to February. Both the 2020 and 2022 marathons were canceled due to the COVID-19 pandemic; there was no 2021 marathon.

Santa Clarita was picked to host stages in the AMGEN Tour of California for a total of 9 years. It has hosted a total of 14 stages as of 2019.

Surrounded by three mountain ranges, the Santa Clarita area contains numerous hiking trails, in areas such as Agua Dulce Canyon, Central Park, East Walker Ranch, Elsmere Canyon, Golden Valley Ranch, Newhall Pass Open Space, Haskell Canyon Open Space, Quigley Canyon, East Canyon, Fish Canyon, San Francisquito Open Space, Tapia Canyon, Towsley Canyon, and Wildwood Canyon.

County parks
The Los Angeles County Department of Parks and Recreation operates one park within the city of Santa Clarita, and two others within the city's sphere of influence.

William S. Hart Regional Park in Newhall includes the estate of silent film star William S. Hart, known as La Loma de los Vientos (The Hill of the Winds) and has hosted the annual Santa Clarita Cowboy Festival since 1994. The William S. Hart Museum, one of three Natural History Museums of Los Angeles County, is located on the grounds of Hart Park. It is the only Los Angeles County park located within the Santa Clarita city limits.

Placerita Canyon State Park is in an unincorporated area east of Newhall, in the western San Gabriel foothills on the southeast side of the Santa Clarita Valley. It is administered by the Los Angeles County Department of Parks and Recreation, in partnership with California State Parks. It features eight hiking trails, equestrian trails, waterfalls, the Oak of the Golden Dream, and the Walker Cabin. Its visitor center, known as Placerita Canyon Nature Center includes exhibits and descriptions of the flora and fauna of the region.

Tesoro Adobe Historic Park was the home of actor Harry Carey, and has been described as "the first tourist attraction in Santa Clarita." It is located in the unincorporated community of Tesoro del Valle, at the northernmost point in Valencia. In June 2005, Montalvo Properties LLC, the developer of Tesoro del Valle, donated the park to Los Angeles County.

Other
The city is home to an ice rink known as The Cube—Ice and Entertainment Center (formerly Ice Station Valencia). It is used for ice skating and hockey. In 2020, Ice Station Valencia was on the brink of permanent closure due to COVID-19, until the city council unanimously voted to acquire the building for $14.2 million. On February 23, 2021, the city council sold Ice Station to American Sports Entertainment Company and the Los Angeles Kings. The city is currently in the process of renovating The Cube to include two large ice rinks (one NHL-size rink and one Olympic-sized rink) and one small ice rink known as The Pond. The rinks, covered with insulated floors, would double as venues for conventions, business meetings, concerts, birthday parties, and filming. The Cube opened on April 12, 2021, with a ribbon-cutting ceremony. It is the home arena for the UCLA Bruins men's ice hockey team and is located along Smyth Drive in Valencia, across the street from Valencia High School.

MB2 Entertainment, previously known as Mountasia Family Fun Center, is an entertainment and recreation center located in Saugus, along Golden Triangle Road (a frontage road of Soledad Canyon Road) near its intersection with Golden Oak Road. It first opened in August 1995, and currently offers miniature golf, go-karts, bumper boats, laser tag, and video games. On March 15, 2020, it was forced to close due to the COVID-19 pandemic. In September, after nearly six months of closure, the owners sold the center. MB2 Group, which operates go-kart racing tracks, purchased the center in February 2021.

Sports
Santa Clarita does not have any sports teams in the NBA, MLB, NFL, or NHL. The professional teams in Los Angeles and Anaheim (specifically, the Clippers and Lakers of the NBA, the Angels and Dodgers of MLB, the Chargers and Rams of the NFL, and Ducks and Kings of the NHL) are popular among Santa Clarita residents. The college sports teams of The Master's University and College of the Canyons, as well as the sports teams in the valley's seven high schools, have some following among the people of Santa Clarita.

The Santa Clarita Blue Heat is a women's soccer team in the United Women's Soccer league. It was founded as the Ventura County Fusion in 2008 and played in the city of Ventura before relocating to Santa Clarita. Their home games are played at The Master's University. Santa Clarita also hosts FC Santa Clarita (also known as the Santa Clarita Storm) of the United Premier Soccer League, a development league. The team was founded in 2006 as the Lancaster Rattlers before moving to Santa Clarita. Like the Blue Heat, FC Santa Clarita plays its home games at The Master's University.

The Canyons Aquatic Club is a competitive swim team based in Santa Clarita affiliated with USA Swimming. Its home pool is located at College of the Canyons, with practice locations at the Santa Clarita Aquatics Center, Santa Clarita Park, Castaic Aquatic Center, North Oaks Park, and Newhall Park.

The Saugus Speedway, located along Soledad Canyon Road in Saugus, is a  race track covering . It first opened in 1939 as Bonelli Stadium. The first stock car racing event on the speedway occurred in 1957. In 1995, the track was permanently closed. The speedway continues to serve as the venue for the Santa Clarita Swap Meet every Sunday.

Central Park contains a  cross country course used by high school and college athletes to train and race.

The city includes four golf courses: Vista Valencia Golf Course and Valencia Country Club in Valencia, and Sand Canyon Country Club and Friendly Valley Golf Course in Canyon Country. The Oaks Club at Valencia is located in the Westridge area of Stevenson Ranch, adjacent to the city.

The Canyon Country Little League baseball and softball teams play their games on a field along Sierra Highway in unincorporated Canyon Country.

Services

Law enforcement
Santa Clarita is a contract city, meaning it does not have its own police department and instead relies on county services. The Los Angeles County Sheriff's Department (LASD) operates the Santa Clarita Valley Sheriff's Station at 26201 Golden Valley Road, just south of the intersection of Golden Valley Road and  Centre Pointe Parkway. Prior to its October 2021 relocation, the Santa Clarita Valley Sheriff's Station was located on Magic Mountain Parkway in Valencia.

The California Highway Patrol's Newhall office patrols the highways and streets of the Santa Clarita Valley. Despite being referred to as the Newhall office, its headquarters are actually located in unincorporated Valencia, along The Old Road just south of State Route 126.

Water

Santa Clarita receives its water from the Santa Clarita Valley Water Agency, also known as SCV Water. The agency was formed on January 1, 2018, through the merger of three agencies: Castaic Lake Water Agency, Newhall County Water District, and the Valencia Water Company. It is split into three water divisions—Santa Clarita, Newhall, and Valencia—descendants of the three original agencies. Its headquarters, adjacent to Central Park in Saugus, include a conservatory garden and learning center with over 350 plant species. The SCV Water Agency sources its water from the California Aqueduct, Castaic Lake, alluvial wells, and the Saugus Aquifer. The SCV Water Agency is currently involved in removing hazardous material from the Saugus Aquifer left behind by decades of munitions testing at the Whittaker-Bermite site (see History section above).

The Los Angeles Aqueduct passes through Santa Clarita on its way from the Owens Valley to Granada Hills, Los Angeles. It passes next to, and is visible from, Saugus High School and the Centre Pointe Business Park. However, Santa Clarita does not receive Los Angeles Aqueduct water–all of the aqueduct's water goes to the city of Los Angeles.

Public libraries
The city operates the Santa Clarita Public Library system, consisting of three libraries: the main office in Valencia, the Old Town Newhall Library in Newhall, and the Jo Anne Darcy Library in Canyon Country. The libraries offer books ranging from preschool to adult reading levels. In addition, each library has a variety of services for students, teachers, and home schoolers, including homework help, mental health, and employment resources, as well as community events. Passport acceptance services are also offered at each library branch. In addition to its three properties, the system includes an eLibrary. The main office in Valencia has a sculpture that says "IMAG NE"; when a person stands between the G and the N the word "IMAGINE" is spelled.

Health services

Henry Mayo Newhall Memorial Hospital (commonly referred to as Henry Mayo Hospital), founded in 1975, is a Level II trauma center and hospital. It includes 357 beds, as well as a helipad, an urgent care center, inpatient facilities, a catheterization lab, a breast imaging center, disaster resource center, outpatient surgery center, and cardiac rehabilitation center. It is located in Valencia, along McBean Parkway at its intersections with Avenida Navarre and Orchard Village Road. The complex which contains Henry Mayo Hospital also includes medical institutions not affiliated with the hospital, such as Valencia Perinatal Services, Advanced Pain Management, UCLA Health, and an office of Heritage Sierra Medical Group.

Santa Clarita is also served by private health care providers such as Exer Urgent Care, Facey Medical Group, Kaiser Permanente, Concentra Urgent Care, and Providence Health & Services.

As part of Los Angeles County, Santa Clarita is under the jurisdiction of the Los Angeles County Department of Public Health. It does not have its own public health agency.

Electricity and gas
Santa Clarita does not have its own electricity or natural gas utilities. The city's electricity comes from Southern California Edison, and its natural gas comes from SoCalGas.

Fire
The city contracts with the Los Angeles County Fire Department for fire protection. The agency has eleven fire stations in the city of Santa Clarita, as well as one station in unincorporated Valencia, two in unincorporated Castaic, one in Val Verde, one in Stevenson Ranch, and one in Agua Dulce.

Post offices
The United States Postal Service operates four post offices in the city: at Creekside Road and McBean Parkway in central Valencia, on Tournament Road in southern Valencia, at Lyons and Peachland Avenues in Newhall, and at Soledad Canyon Road east of Sierra Highway in Canyon Country. Two post offices are located in the Santa Clarita Valley just outside the city limits, at The Old Road and Towsley Canyon Road in unincorporated Newhall, and on Franklin Parkway in the Valencia Commerce Center. There is also a Contract Postal Unit located in the Saugus Drugs store at Bouquet and Haskell Canyon Roads.

Other
The California Department of Motor Vehicles has an office in Newhall, at the southwest corner of Lyons Avenue and Newhall Avenue, serving the entire Santa Clarita Valley.

Crime
Santa Clarita has a relatively low crime rate. The city's violent crime rate is about one-third of the national average and 29% of the California statewide average. In 2020, the home security site Safety ranked Santa Clarita the seventh-safest city in California, specifically mentioning the low property crime rate. Then-mayor Cameron Smyth credited this to the "diligence" of the Santa Clarita Valley Sheriff's Station.

Nevertheless some of the poorer neighborhoods of Santa Clarita have struggled with crime. The apartment and condominium complexes along Jakes Way in Canyon Country (south of the Santa Clara River, east of Sierra Highway, north of the Metrolink railroad line, and west of State Route 14) have seen some of the highest crime rates in the city. Gangs such as Brown Familia and Newhall 13 are active in parts of Canyon Country and Newhall.

Notable criminal incidents that have made news about Santa Clarita have included some racist and bigoted acts against Black, Latino, and Jewish residents among others. Many of these residents have banded together to fight against racist and bigoted acts. Other past incidents have included a shootout in 1970 known as the Newhall incident, the Stevenson Ranch shootout in 2001, and the Saugus High School shooting in 2019.

Economy
Companies based in Santa Clarita include Princess Cruises, Honda Performance Development, Precision Dynamics Corporation, condomman.com, Newhall Land and Farming Company, HASA, and the American division of Advanced Bionics. Sunkist, Mechanix Wear, Remo, and WayForward are headquartered just outside the city in unincorporated Valencia.

Largest employers

According to the city's Comprehensive Annual Financial Report, for the fiscal year ending June 30, 2020, here are the top employers in the city.

Shopping and commercial centers

Westfield Valencia Town Center

The largest shopping center in Santa Clarita is the Westfield Valencia Town Center. This large shopping mall owned by Unibail-Rodamco-Westfield occupies an area bounded by Valencia Boulevard to the south, McBean Parkway to the west, Magic Mountain Parkway to the north, and Citrus Street to the east. Anchor stores include Macy's, JCPenney, H&M, Gold's Gym, and Forever 21; there is also a Regal Edwards movie theater. Town Center Drive circles the interior of the mall. Westfield Valencia Town Center and the surrounding area functions as one of the city's major business districts — within the area are the headquarters of Princess Cruises, the Santa Clarita City Hall, Santa Clarita Courthouse, Santa Clarita Valley Sheriff's Station, and Santa Clarita Valley Medical Plaza. Most of the city's car dealerships are just north of the Town Center, near Magic Mountain Parkway, Creekside Road, and Auto Center Drive.

Old Town Newhall
The historic district of Old Town Newhall (aka. Downtown Newhall) is a major cultural and business center. It contains many independent restaurants, stores, and theaters, as well as a public library. Notable businesses in Old Town Newhall include Newhall Refinery (a gastropub), Newhall Press Room, The Old Town Junction, Brewery Draconum, Jazmin's Bakery, Commando Military Surplus, Pulchella Winery, National Glass, The Schiitr (a home audio store), Placerita Liquor, Santa Clarita Valley Food Pantry, and Hotel Lexen. The areas surrounding Old Town Newhall are predominantly Hispanic, and there are many Mexican restaurants including La Charrita, El Pueblo, El Taco Llama, and El Pariente. Theaters in Old Town Newhall include Canyon Theater Guild, The Main, and Laemmle. The Old Town Newhall Farmers Market is located on the grounds of the public library. Other notable sites in the area include the William S. Hart Park; Newhall DMV; Newhall Elementary School (part of the Newhall School District); Newhall Metrolink station; Newhall Terrace, Newhall Crossings, and Californian apartment complexes; Veterans Historical Plaza; First Presbyterian Church of Newhall; Unity Center mosque; Newhall Community Center; and the historic Saugus Train Station (Heritage Junction). The official Old Town Newhall website describes it as "Santa Clarita's premier arts and entertainment district." The Hart and Main wedding and event venue is scheduled to open in spring 2022. Some of the recent developments in Old Town Newhall have been described as gentrification.

Others
Numerous shopping centers are scattered throughout the city along major thoroughfares. These shopping centers include both chain stores and small businesses.

Industrial centers

Santa Clarita includes several industrial areas and office parks.

Stretching from Valencia High School to the I-5/CA-126 interchange, it includes the headquarters of the Saugus Union School District and The Santa Clarita Valley Signal, offices of Advanced Bionics, Aerospace Dynamics International, Woodward, and ATK Audiotek, and other businesses such as The Home Depot, Smart and Final, Pocock Brewing Company, O'Connor Photography, Marriott and Hilton hotels, Forrest Machining, Office Depot, and The Cube Ice and Entertainment Center. Rye Canyon Business Park and Southern California Innovation Park, just north of the Valencia Industrial Center, are home to a Walmart Supercenter, Scooter's Jungle, Boston Scientific Corporation, Legacy Volleyball Club, Trinity Classical Academy, and the city's transit maintenance facility.

The Centre Pointe Business Park is located near the city's geographic center, south of Soledad Canyon Road on both sides of Golden Valley Road. It includes the Centre Pointe Village and Centre Pointe Marketplace shopping centers, with tenants such as Sam's Club, Walmart, Dick's Sporting Goods, Ashley HomeStore, Jo-Ann, Spirit Halloween, Rattler's Bar B Que, Bank of America, and Starbucks; other businesses such as the Country Antique Fair Mall, Mountasia Family Fun Center, operations facility of John Paul Mitchell Systems, Bocchi Laboratories, Top Out Climbing Gym, Home Depot, Pep Boys, and several body shops; Bowman High School; and the William S. Hart Union High School District headquarters.

Other industrial areas in the city include Saugus Station, on the east side of Railroad Avenue; Valencia Corporate Center, on Tourney Road just east of Interstate 5; Needham Ranch, on Sierra Highway south of Newhall Avenue; and Vista Canyon, on Lost Canyon Road west of Sand Canyon Road. The unincorporated area of Valencia west of Interstate 5 also contains several business parks, such as the Valencia Commerce Center.

Media
The City of Santa Clarita and surrounding communities are served by several local media organizations.

Newspapers
Santa Clarita is served by the Los Angeles Daily News and The Santa Clarita Valley Signal. The Daily News primarily focuses on news, sports and entertainment stories in the city of Los Angeles and adjacent areas, but also covers Santa Clarita periodically. Daily News circulation numbers within the Santa Clarita Valley are not known.

The Santa Clarita Valley Signal

The primary daily newspaper, The Santa Clarita Valley Signal, was founded in 1919. In 2012, it had a weekday circulation of 10,454 and a Sunday circulation of 11,598. Until 2018, the newspaper focused almost exclusively on local news, sports, entertainment and features. In October 2016, the Signal moved its headquarters from Creekside Road in Valencia to Diamond Place near Centre Pointe Parkway; since October 2021, it has been headquartered on Avenue Stanford in the Valencia Industrial Center.

From 1979 to 2016, the Signal was owned by Morris Multimedia which is a company based in Savannah, Georgia. In 2016, Morris Multimedia sold the Signal to Paladin Multi-Media Group. In June 2018, Richard and Chris Budman purchased Paladin and began to publish a new free Sunday magazine, featuring a column by editor-in-chief Tim Whyte under the byline "Black and Whyte". According to an October 9, 2018 article in the Columbia Journalism Review (CJR), the new management led to a conservative shift in the paper's editorial stance, which prompted a group of progressives in the Santa Clarita Valley to start their own news outlet, the Proclaimer.

Radio
The primary radio station serving the Santa Clarita Valley is the Hometown Station, or KHTS. KHTS broadcasts on FM 98.1 and AM 1220. The KHTS transmitters are located along Sierra Highway in unincorporated northern Canyon Country, and its studios have been in Old Town Newhall since June 2015. KHTS was founded as KBET in 1984 and was renamed KIIS and later KHTS. KHTS is a full-service station—it covers local news, including talk shows, high school and college sports, as well as professional sports in the Los Angeles area.

The region is also served by FM-101.5 KZNQ-LP, Santa Clarita's first local FM radio station. It features a non-profit country music format owned and is operated by Santa Clarita Public Broadcasters Corporation, transmitting from Round Mountain in the city of Santa Clarita since 2015.

In addition to KHTS and KZNQ-LP, Santa Clarita and its surrounding communities are indirectly served by a number of major market Los Angeles FM and AM radio stations.

There are also several other Internet-based radio stations that serve the public in the Santa Clarita Valley.

Television
All local programming for Santa Clarita is carried on a single public-access television cable TV channel, which is operated by SCVTV, a tax-exempt 501(c)(3) nonprofit corporation. It is available to Spectrum Cable customers throughout the Santa Clarita Valley on Channel 20 and to AT&T U-verse customers under local programming (Channel 99/Santa Clarita). SCVTV carries public, educational and government programming, including Santa Clarita City Council and Planning Commission meetings, history shows, high school and college news programs, talk shows, football games, and other programs of local interest. SCVTV also runs the local news website scvnews.com and the history website scvhistory.com. scvhistory.com contains archives of the Santa Clarita Valley Historical Society.

There are no commercial over-the-air television stations in the Santa Clarita Valley. The city is part of the Los Angeles media market. Digital signals from the Los Angeles stations are available on local cable television systems, DirecTV, and Dish Network.

Podcasts
Local podcast studios serving the Santa Clarita Valley include Podcast SCV and Arcay Studios.

Magazines
Magazines serving the Santa Clarita Valley include Seasons (which covers city-sponsored recreational programs), élite, Santa Clarita Magazine, and Inside SCV.

Transportation

Highways
 The only interstate highway in the city is Interstate 5, which defines the city's western border. Interstate 5 is one of the main arteries of the western United States, and connects Santa Clarita with the rest of greater Los Angeles to the south and the Central Valley to the north. 
 California State Route 14 passes through the east side of the city and connects Santa Clarita to the Antelope Valley cities of Palmdale and Lancaster. Route 14 merges with Interstate 5 at the large Newhall Pass interchange just south of the city. This interchange is the primary route used by Santa Claritans commuting to Los Angeles. Due to the rugged terrain of the Santa Susana and San Gabriel Mountains, it is one of the few routes (and the only freeway) connecting northern Los Angeles County with the rest of the county.
 California State Route 126 follows the Santa Clara River from I-5 in Santa Clarita to Ventura, passing through Piru, Fillmore, and Santa Paula. The Santa Clarita Veterans' Parkway, formerly the Cross Valley Connector, connects Route 126 in Valencia to Route 14 on the city's eastern edge. It includes the entirety of Newhall Ranch Road, and Golden Valley Road from Newhall Ranch Road to State Route 14. 
 Sierra Highway passes through the east side of the city, parallel to and west of Route 14, providing an alternate route to the Sierra Pelona Mountains and Antelope Valley, as well as to the Los Angeles Basin. Although named a highway, it is actually a surface street in the Santa Clarita area.

Bus service

City of Santa Clarita Transit, formerly known simply as Santa Clarita Transit, provides extensive bus service within the Santa Clarita Valley and to/from North Hollywood in the San Fernando Valley. City of Santa Clarita Transit is operated by MV Transportation, under contract with the city of Santa Clarita.

On weekdays, City of Santa Clarita Transit operates commuter buses to/from Union Station in downtown Los Angeles and North Hollywood Station (operating seven days per week as the "NoHo Express/757"), allowing riders to access Metro Los Angeles rapid transit subway and light rail services, as well as Warner Center, Burbank, Van Nuys, Century City, and UCLA. During the summer, the city provides a limited express service to the Santa Monica Pier.

On weekdays when school is in session, City of Santa Clarita Transit operates supplemental school-day service with routes and scheduled stops designed around various schools within the Santa Clarita Valley.

City of Santa Clarita Transit also operates Dial-A-Ride service for seniors and the disabled. The service allows for pick-up and drop-off at any address within the City of Santa Clarita and within a three-quarter mile radius of the nearest fixed route bus stop in unincorporated areas.

City of Santa Clarita Transit operates weekdays from 4:55 a.m.–10:30 p.m., Saturdays from 6:30 a.m.-9:45 p.m., and on Sundays from 7:15 a.m. to 9:00 p.m. Service operates as frequently as every 10 minutes during peak periods to every 85 minutes during off-peak hours. Typically buses operate every 25 to 60 minutes.

Rail

Metrolink provides commuter passenger train service to the Santa Clarita Valley along its Antelope Valley Line which runs from Lancaster to Union Station in downtown Los Angeles, where transfers can be made to destinations in Southern California and the rest of the nation. There are three Metrolink stations in the city: Via Princessa in Canyon Country, Santa Clarita station in Saugus (near the geographic center of the city), and Newhall station in Newhall. All stations have large parking lots to allow commuters to park and ride. An additional Metrolink station known as Vista Canyon is slated for construction in Canyon Country, east of the current Via Princessa station. Metrolink service operates 7 days a week, with reduced service on Saturdays and Sundays.

Bicycle and walking
There are a series of bike trails and walking paths threaded throughout the city. Bicyclists can ride from the eastern end of the city in Canyon Country along a paved path which is independent from automobile traffic all the way to Valencia on the Santa Clara River Trail. This path closely follows the Santa Clara River and Soledad Canyon Road. There are many jumping-off points along this route providing access to neighborhoods, Metrolink stations and commerce. In Valencia, there are several pedestrian bridges called paseos connected to the bike path network. The paseos keep riders and walkers above and away from automobile traffic. The neighborhoods in Valencia were planned to include an ample amount of walking and riding paths that connect to this overall network. In 2007, the League of American Bicyclists awarded Santa Clarita its bronze designation as a bicycle friendly community.

Air travel
There are no airports in the city of Santa Clarita. The nearest airports are the small Agua Dulce Airpark in Agua Dulce and Whiteman Airport in Pacoima.

Culture

Films

Santa Clarita, along with other foothill regions in Greater Los Angeles is known for its movie ranches. The valley contains multiple movie ranches including Melody Ranch, Sable Ranch, Rancho Deluxe, Golden Oak Ranch, Blue Cloud Movie Ranch, and Veluzat Movie Ranch. These movie ranches lie within the studio zone, the area within a  radius of the intersection of Beverly and La Cienega Boulevards in West Los Angeles. Movie ranches are a major contributor to Santa Clarita's economy, and the valley has been nicknamed "Hollywood North." Movies and TV shows filmed in Santa Clarita include Django Unchained, NCIS, Franklin & Bash, Jane by Design, Make It or Break It, The Muppets, Pirates of the Caribbean, 24, and Old Yeller.

Other filming locations in the Santa Clarita Valley include CalArts, Castaic Lake, College of the Canyons, Westfield Valencia Town Center, Placerita Canyon State Park, Southern California Innovation Park (an office park in Valencia), Saugus Cafe, and Halfway House Cafe which is on the outskirts of Canyon Country.

Santa Clarita was the setting of the horror-comedy show Santa Clarita Diet, which debuted on February 3, 2017 and was canceled on April 26, 2019. The show revolves around the careers of real estate agents Joel and Sheila Hammond. Sheila Hammond becomes undead and starts craving human flesh. As Joel and the family try helping Sheila during her metamorphosis, they deal with neighbors and cultural norms.

Western films

Santa Clarita has been the home of many well-known stars of Western film, including William S. Hart, Harry Carey, John Ford, and Gene Autry. Western film, television, and radio figures are honored at the Walk of Western Stars, located along Main Street in Old Town Newhall. Each April, the city of Santa Clarita inducts one or two new honorees into the Walk of Western Stars. The walk was founded in 1981; previous honorees have included Roy Rogers, Dale Evans, John Wayne, Sam Elliott, Richard Farnsworth, and Bruce Dern. The induction ceremony is held in conjunction with the Santa Clarita Cowboy Festival at William S. Hart Park.

Packard Humanities Institute
The Packard Humanities Institute, headquartered in Los Altos, also has a campus in Santa Clarita. The campus, which opened in 2014, is located in Valencia directly south of College of the Canyons. It includes a film preservation facility which houses more than 400,000 films from Paramount Pictures, Warner Brothers, Columbia Pictures, 20th Century Fox, and Republic Pictures.

Notable people

Sister cities
The city is a member of Sister Cities International.
 Tena, Napo, Ecuador
 Sariaya, Quezon, Philippines

Explanatory notes

References

External links

 
 Santa Clarita Valley Historical Society archive
 Santa Clarita tourism
 Official guide

 
1987 establishments in California
Cities in Los Angeles County, California
Incorporated cities and towns in California
Populated places established in 1987